Pilninsky District is an administrative district (raion), one of the forty in Nizhny Novgorod Oblast, Russia. Municipally, it is incorporated as Pilninsky Municipal District. It is located in the east of the oblast. Its administrative center is the urban locality (a work settlement) of Pilna. Population: 21,960 (2010 Census);  The population of Pilna accounts for 33.4% of the district's total population.

History
The district was established in 1929.

Notable residents 

Vladimir Averchev (1946–2022), politician, born in the village of Maltsevo
Shaymardan Ibragimov (1899–1957), politician

References

Notes

Sources

External links
Official website of Pilninsky District 
Old official website of Pilninsky District (contains materials not yet transferred to the new website) 

Districts of Nizhny Novgorod Oblast
 
States and territories established in 1929
